Victoria Valeriyevna Abramchenko (born 22 May 1975) is a Russian politician and economist. Since January 21, 2020, she has served as Deputy Prime Minister of the Russian Federation with responsibility for Agro-Industrial Complex, Natural Resources and Ecology.

Early life and education
Victoria Valeriyevna Abramchenko was born on 22 May 1975, in the city of Chernogorsk, Khakass Autonomous Oblast, Krasnoyarsk Krai, in what was then the Russian Soviet Federative Socialist Republic of the Soviet Union.

In 1998 she graduated from the Institute of Land Management, Cadastres and Environmental Engineering in the structure of the Krasnoyarsk State Agrarian University. In 2004, she graduated from the Russian Academy of Public Administration under the President of the Russian Federation.

Career
Between 1998 and 2000 she worked in the Committee on Land Resources and Land Management of Russia (Roskomzem).

From 2000 to 2001 she was employed by the Federal State Institution "Land Cadastral Chamber".

From 2001 to 2005 she worked in various positions, including as Deputy Head of the Department in Roszemkadastra and Rosnedvizhimost.

Since 2005, she has held various positions in the Ministry of Economic Development of Russia, including the position of Deputy Director of the Real Estate Department of the Ministry of Economic Development of Russia. In 2011, she was appointed as Deputy Head of the Federal Service for State Registration, Cadastre and Cartography.

From 2012 to 2015 she was Director of the Department of Land Policy, Property Relations and State Property of the Ministry of Agriculture of the Russian Federation.

From 2015 to 2016, she was Deputy Minister of Agriculture of the Russian Federation.

From 11 October 2016 to 21 January 2020, she was Deputy Minister of Economic Development of the Russian Federation and head of the Federal Service for State Registration, Cadastre and Cartography.

On 21 January 2020, she was appointed to Deputy Prime Minister of the Russian Federation in Mikhail Mishustin's Cabinet.

She is a member of the United Russia political party.

Sanctions
In December 2022 the EU sanctioned Viktoria Abramchenko in relation to the 2022 Russian invasion of Ukraine.

References

External links

1978 births
Living people
Government ministers of Russia
United Russia politicians
People from Khakassia
21st-century Russian women politicians